The Social Democracy party was a radical and social-liberal political party in Italy.

History
The Social Democracy party was formed for the 1919 general election by the union of the Constitutional Democratic Party with several other parties of the liberal left. In that occasion the party, that was especially strong in Southern Italy, gained 10.9% of the vote and 60 seats in the Chamber of Deputies.

Four years later, in 1921 general election the party won only 4.7% of the vote and 29 seats.

In January 1922 the "National Council of Social Democracy and Radicalism" was officially created; this event is considered the date of the party official formation and of the dissolution of the Italian Radical Party. The main party's founders were Giovanni Antonio Colonna di Cesarò, Arturo Labriola and Ettore Sacchi.

After the March on Rome, the party took part to the governments of Benito Mussolini until July 1924. It gained only 1.6% of votes in the general election of the same year and Antonio Colonna di Cesarò took part to the Aventine Secession. The party was disbanded by the regime in 1926, as all the other parties.

After World War II some of its members joined the Labour Democratic Party, a centre-left party.

Electoral results

References

1922 establishments in Italy
1926 disestablishments in Italy
Defunct political parties in Italy
Political parties established in 1922
Political parties disestablished in 1926
Radical parties in Italy
Banned political parties in Italy